Para Aventuras y  Curiosidades (English: For Adventures and Curiosities) is the debut studio album by Venezuelan-American duo Mau y Ricky. It was released on May 3, 2019, through Sony Music Latin. The album is the follow-up to their debut EP Arte (2017), and features guest appearances from Sebastián Yatra, Becky G, Karol G, Lali, Manuel Turizo, Leslie Grace and Camilo.

Background
The duo announced the title of the album in an interview with Forbes magazine, in which they said that "[it] represents what the all encompassing idea behind the album is." After its May 2019 release, the album debuted at number 22 on the Billboard Top Latin Albums chart, and at number 5 on the Latin Pop Albums chart, with 2,000 equivalent album units, with nearly all of that sum derived from streaming activity. The album features smash-hits "Mi Mala", "Ya No Tiene Novio", "Desconocidos" and Lali's "Sin Querer Queriendo", in which the duo appears as featured artist.

Track listing

Charts

Weekly charts

Year-end charts

Certifications

References

2019 albums
Spanish-language albums